Dicepolia is a genus of moths of the family Crambidae.

Species
Dicepolia aerealis Hayden, 2009
Dicepolia amazonalis Hayden, 2009
Dicepolia artoides Hayden, 2009
Dicepolia bicolor Hayden, 2009
Dicepolia cuiabalis Hayden, 2009
Dicepolia marginescriptalis (Kenrick, 1917)
Dicepolia marionalis (Viette, 1958)
Dicepolia munroealis (Viette, 1960)
Dicepolia nigritinctalis Hayden, 2010
Dicepolia roseobrunnea (Warren, 1889)
Dicepolia rufeolalis (Mabille, 1900)
Dicepolia rufitinctalis (Hampson, 1899)
Dicepolia vaga Hayden, 2009
Dicepolia venezolalis Hayden, 2009

References

Eurrhypini
Crambidae genera
Taxa named by Pieter Cornelius Tobias Snellen